Digital Champ: Battle Boxing is a single-player video game released in 1989 for TurboGrafx-16 by Naxat Soft. The game was released to the Wii Virtual Console in Japan on April 15, 2008, Europe on May 16, 2008, and in North America on October 20, 2008. It was released in the mid-2010s for the Wii Virtual Console.

The game takes place in the fictional year 20XX, with the main player as a mutant fighting hordes of boxer clones before facing off against a robotic boxer. Three clone opponents exist; Marciano, Mick and Samson. Each match is a maximum of twelve rounds, each  being three minutes.

References

1989 video games
Boxing video games
Kaga Create games
TurboGrafx-16 games
Video games developed in Japan
Video games scored by Atsuhiro Motoyama
Video games set in the 21st century
Virtual Console games
Virtual Console games for Wii U